The Zimbabwean Ambassador in Beijing is the official representative of the Government in Harare to the Government of the People's Republic of China.

List of ambassadors 

China–Zimbabwe relations

References

 
China
Zimbabwe